The 2017 edition of the Judo Grand Slam Tokyo was held in Tokyo, Japan, from 2 to 3 December 2017.

Medal summary

Men's events

Women's events

Source Results

Medal table

References

External links
 

2017 IJF World Tour
2017 Judo Grand Slam
Judo
Grand Slam, 2017
Judo
Judo